Dirk Kramer (born 11 April 1960) is a German former skier. He competed in the Nordic combined event at the 1984 Winter Olympics.

References

External links
 

1960 births
Living people
German male Nordic combined skiers
Olympic Nordic combined skiers of West Germany
Nordic combined skiers at the 1984 Winter Olympics
People from Korbach
Sportspeople from Kassel (region)